Marat Safin defeated Lleyton Hewitt in the final, 1–6, 6–3, 6–4, 6–4 to win the men's singles tennis title at the 2005 Australian Open. It was his second and last major title, having also won the 2000 US Open. Safin saved a match point en route to the title, against Roger Federer in the semifinals. Hewitt was the first Australian to reach the final since Pat Cash in 1988.

Federer was the defending champion, but lost in the semifinals to Safin in a rematch of the previous year's final. Despite holding a match point in the fourth set, Federer's loss ended his 26-match winning streak dating to the 2004 US Open.

The final attracted many viewers in Australia (primarily due to the presence of countryman Hewitt), averaging 4.05 million viewers. The viewing audience remains one of the highest in Australian history. The match was broadcast in the host nation by host broadcaster the Seven Network with commentators Bruce McAvaney and two-time champion Jim Courier (in his first appearance on Australian commercial television).

This tournament was the first major in which future ten-time Australian Open champion Novak Djokovic competed in the main draw (lost to Safin in the first round), and the last Australian Open where four-time champion Andre Agassi competed in the main draw. Future 22-time major champion Rafael Nadal advanced beyond the third round of a major for the first time, losing to Hewitt in the fourth round. It was also the last major in which neither Federer, Nadal, nor Djokovic reached the final until the 2014 US Open, a span of 38 events.

Seeds

Qualifying

Draw

Finals

Top half

Section 1

Section 2

Section 3

Section 4

Bottom half

Section 5

Section 6

Section 7

Section 8

Other entry information

Wild cards

Protected ranking

Qualifiers

Lucky losers

Withdrawals

References

External links
 Association of Tennis Professionals (ATP) – 2005 Australian Open Men's Singles draw
 2005 Australian Open – Men's draws and results at the International Tennis Federation

Mens singles
Australian Open (tennis) by year – Men's singles